The Internet in Poland was used by 90.4% of households in the country and 98.6% business entities in 2020. 
In 2022, the percentage of households with internet will increase to 93.3%.

Facts and figures
 Top-level domain: .pl
 Internet users: 31.97 million users; 84.5% of the population (2021).
 Fixed broadband: 6.4 million subscriptions, 17th in the world; 16.6% of the population, 54th in the world (2012).
 Wireless broadband: 18.9 million subscriptions, 16th in the world; 49.3% of the population, 33rd in the world (2012).
 Internet hosts: 13.3 million hosts, 12th in the world (2012).
 IPv4: 19.4 million addresses allocated, 21st in the world, 0.5% of the world total, 505.9 addresses per 1000 people (2012).

 70.6% of households in Poland with no internet access indicated that they have no need to use it.

 In August 2020, the number of mobile device users exceeded the number of fixed-line internet users.

The first analogue Internet connection was launched on September 26, 1990 and had a speed of approximately 9600 bits per second. The Institute of Nuclear Physics of the Polish Academy of Sciences received the first IP address in Poland (192.86.14.0) on 19 November 1990, assigned to it by the United States Department of Defense. This institute was also the recipient of the first e-mail sent to Poland, sent by CERN on 20 November 1990, and received on a MicroVax II computer.

Pricing
According to an OECD report, the price of Internet access in Poland in September 2012 ranged from $0.45 to $128.12 PPP per megabit per second (Mbit/s) of advertised speed. This places Poland in the middle on the low end (18th lowest out of 34 countries) and at the top on the high end (second highest behind New Zealand at $130.20). This compares with ranges of $0.40 to $23.25 for Germany, $0.40 to $12.35 for the Czech Republic, and $0.53 to $41.70 for the U.S.

According to Eurostat, the OECD and others, Internet access in Poland in the early 2010s was among the most expensive in Europe. This was mostly due to a lack of competition and lack of experience. New operators like Dialog and GTS Energis are designing their own provider lines and are offering more attractive and cheaper services. In February 2011, the Polish Office of Electronic Communication issued an order forcing TPSA to rent 51% of their ADSL lines to other ISPs at 60% discount of their market pricing. As the result, the prices are non-competitive. Other ISP charge as TPSA makes a guaranteed 40% profit, while TPSA has no incentive to lower its consumer prices, because that would result in a lowering of wholesale prices as well.

ADSL
The most popular ADSL services for home users in Poland are Neostrada provided by TPSA and Net24 provided by Netia. Both provide download speeds in the range of 10 to 80 Mbit/s and upload speeds of 1 Mbit/s or more. Business users as well as some home users use Internet DSL TP also offered by TPSA.

Neostrada
ADSL and VDSL service is offered by Neostrada.

Internet DSL TP
There is another ADSL option available, targeted mainly at business clients, called Internet DSL TP. The link availability is guaranteed, offers static IP addresses, and a modem with Ethernet interface.

Net24
ADSL service called Net24, provided by TP's main competitor Netia. The service can be installed on ISDN lines.

Netia also offers ADSL (BiznesNet24) and SDSL (SuperNet24) subscriptions for business customers, which offer static IP addresses and higher speeds.

Multimo
ADSL service called Multimo, provided by GTS Energis for TP customers via Bit Stream Access.

DialNET DSL
ADSL service called DialNET DSL, provided by Dialog now bought by Netia.

Cable
Cable providers such as Multimedia, UPC, Vectra and ASTER offer triple play services.

VECTRA
Vectra, after the purchase of Multimedia, is the largest cable network in Poland. (Reaches 4.4 million households).

INEA
Cable provider offering HFC and FTTH internet access from Greater Poland. Initially offered up to 10 Gbit/s for selected locations with FTTH which was reduced later to 8,5 Gbit/s and up to 1 Gbit/s in most locations. HFC offerings are asymmetric and FTTH are symmetric.

UPC
UPC has upgraded its "Fiber Power" internet service to higher speeds, offering internet with download speeds from 10 Mbit/s up to 1 Gbit/s. (Reaches 3.7 million households). play (p4) buys upc

ASTER
ASTER used to provide triple play to many cities in Poland, especially Warsaw and Kraków with speeds ranging from 1 Mbit/s to 120 Mbit/s.

On January 2, 2012, Aster merged with UPC. As a result, every service was bumped into the higher tier and the daytime half speed throttling was removed.

HETAN
HETAN provides stationary Internet via Satellite to whole Poland for private and business customers with speeds ranging from 10 Mbit/s to 20 Mbit/s in download and from 2 Mbit/s to 6 Mbit/s in upload.
HETAN launched its services in August 2011, and is since then market leader in providing internet via KA-satellite services to private households and SME's in Poland. HETAN is the largest reseller of Tooway/Skylogic Services in Poland and also represents Hylass/Avanti.

KORBANK
KORBANK provides Triple Play, especially in FTTx or ETH technology. The firm allows subscribers to connect and use computer-based telecommunications networks using independent Internet connections boasting high quality and transmission capacity, digital telephony and new generation TV. Operations focus on Lower Silesia and Masovia regions, where telecommunications services are offered to both retail and business clients. KORBANK is also founder of the first in Europe IPTV Platform based on Unicast Protocol - AVIOS.

During Civic Platform government
In early 2011, Internet censorship legislation that included the creation of a registry of blocked websites was abandoned by the Polish government, following protests and petitions opposing the proposal.

In 2011, the Office for Electronic Communications reported that law enforcement agencies requested access to telecommunications data (including call logs, telephone locations, and names registered to specific numbers) 1.8 million times, an increase of 500,000 over the number of requests in 2010.

In January 2012, thousands protested Prime Minister Tusk's signing of the Anti-Counterfeiting Trade Agreement (ACTA), establishing international standards for enforcing intellectual property rights, accusing it of facilitating Internet censorship. Additionally, in February, Tusk suspended ratification of ACTA because his government had made insufficient consultations before signing the agreement to ensure it was entirely safe for Polish citizens.

In September 2012, the creator of the website Antykomor.pl that satirized President Komorowski was sentenced to 15 months of restricted liberty and 600 hours of community service for defaming the president.

See also
 CERT Polska, Computer Emergency Response Team for Poland.
 Media of Poland
 Telecommunications in Poland

References

External links